Jaren Ray Johnston (born October 4, 1980) is an American country music and rock singer and songwriter. He is a member of the group The Cadillac Three.

Career
Jaren is a multiple time Grammy nominated songwriter and producer. Johnston was formerly the vocalist and guitarist in the Rock band American Bang. After American Bang disbanded, he and two of its other members formed a second band originally called Cadillac Black, which was renamed to The Cadillac Three.

Johnston has also had 9 number one’s with other artists. They include: "You Gonna Fly" and “Raise 'Em Up” by Keith Urban, "Southern Girl" and “Meanwhile Back at Mama's” by Tim McGraw, "Tippin' Point" by Dallas Smith, and "Days of Gold" and "Beachin'" by Jake Owen” .

Personal life
Johnston is married to Evyn Mustoe Johnston, who is also in the music industry. They have a son name Jude.

Johnston's father, Jerry Ray Johnston, was drummer in the country band Bandana. Jerry Ray Johnston died on January 9, 2022.

Singles

Associated Act Cuts

Album Cuts

References

American male singer-songwriters
American country rock singers
American country singer-songwriters
American rock guitarists
American Southern Rock musicians
American male guitarists
Living people
People from Nashville, Tennessee
Singer-songwriters from Tennessee
1980 births
Guitarists from Tennessee
21st-century American singers
Country musicians from Tennessee
21st-century American guitarists
21st-century American male singers